Leopold V, Archduke of Further Austria (October 9, 1586 – September 13, 1632) was the son of Archduke Charles II of Inner Austria, and the younger brother of Emperor Ferdinand II, father of Ferdinand Charles, Archduke of Further Austria. He was Bishop of Passau and of Strasbourg, until he resigned to get married, and Archduke of Further Austria including Tirol.

Biography 
Leopold was born in Graz, and was invested as bishop in 1598, as a child, even though he had not been ordained as a priest; he became Bishop of Strasbourg in 1607, a post which he held until 1626. From 1609 onwards he fought with his mercenaries in the War of the Jülich succession, and in the Brothers' Quarrel within the Austrian Habsburg dynasty against his first cousin Maximilian III, Archduke of Further Austria in Tyrol, and from 1611 for his first cousin Rudolf II in Bohemia. In 1614, he financed the construction of the Church of the Jesuit College of Molsheim, within which his coat of arms is still prominently displayed.

In 1619, upon the death of his kinsman and former rival, he became governor of Maximilian's inheritance: Further Austria and Tyrol, where he attained the position of ruler as Archduke of Further Austria from 1626 to his death in 1632. In 1626 he resigned his ecclesiastical positions and married  Claudia de' Medici. He had the custom house and the Jesuit church built in Innsbruck. He fought for the Veltlin and defended Tyrol against the Swedes in 1632. He died in Schwaz, Tyrol.
[[File:1 thaler Leopold V of Austria - 1621.png|thumb|250px|Silver coin: 1 thaler County of Tyrol, Leopold V - 1621<ref>Year: 1620 - 1621; Composition: Silver; Weight: 28,4 gram; Diameter: 42 mm - https://en.numista.com/catalogue/pieces94533.html</ref>]]

Issue
With his wife Claudia de' Medici, he became the founder of a sideline of the Habsburg family, which persisted until 1665 - the most recent line of Archdukes of Further Austria'''.

His children were:

 Maria-Eleonora 1627–1629
 Ferdinand Charles (1628–1662); married Anna de' Medici
 Isabella-Clara (1629–1685); married Charles III, Duke of Mantua
 Sigismund Francis (1630-1665); married Hedwig of the Palatinate-Sulzbach
 Maria Leopoldine (1632–1649); married Emperor Ferdinand III

Ancestors

References 

Leopold V of Austria
Leopold V of Austria
17th-century archdukes of Austria
Counts of Tyrol
17th-century Roman Catholic bishops in the Holy Roman Empire
Roman Catholic bishops of Passau
Bishops of Strasbourg
Knights of the Golden Fleece